Pictichromis is a genus of ray-finned fishes from the subfamily Pseudochrominae, which is one of four subfamilies in the dottyback family Pseudochromidae. They occur in the western and central Pacific Ocean.

Species
There are eight species in the genus:

 Pictichromis aurifrons (Lubbock, 1980) (Gold-browed dottyback)
 Pictichromis caitlinae Allen, A.C. Gill & Erdmann, 2008 (Cenderawasih dottyback)
 Pictichromis coralensis A.C. Gill, 2004 (Bicoloured dottyback)
 Pictichromis diadema (Lubbock & Randall, 1978) (Diadem dottyback)
 Pictichromis dinar Randall & Schultz, 2009 (Dottyback)
 Pictichromis ephippiata (A.C. Gill, Pyle & Earle, 1996) (Saddled dottyback)
 Pictichromis paccagnellae (Axelrod, 1973) (Royal dottyback)
 Pictichromis porphyrea (Lubbock & Goldman, 1974) (Magenta dottyback)

References

 
Pseudochrominae